The 1962–63 WHL season was the 11th season of the Western Hockey League. The San Francisco Seals were the Lester Patrick Cup champions as they beat the Seattle Totems four games to three in the final series. 

Phil Maloney of Vancouver was named the most valuable player, while Guyle Fielder led the league in scoring.

Final Standings 

bold - qualified for playoffs

Playoffs 

The San Francisco Seals defeated the Seattle Totems 4 games to 3 to win the Lester Patrick Cup.

References

Bibliography

 

Western Hockey League (1952–1974) seasons
1962–63 in American ice hockey by league
1962–63 in Canadian ice hockey by league